The MDW Heavyweight Championship is a professional wrestling heavyweight championship in Mason-Dixon Wrestling (MDW). It was the original heavyweight title of the Atlantic Coast Championship Wrestling promotion during its first year of operation. In December 1998, the promotion became Mason-Dixon Wrestling and the title became the MDW Heavyweight Championship.

The inaugural champion was "Freebird" Buddy Rose, who defeated Dark Overlord in Clarksburg, West Virginia on August 23, 1997 to become the first ACCW Heavyweight Champion. Brian Logan and Mason Hunter are tied for the record of most reigns, with two each. At 411 days, Jamie Harris' first and only reign is the longest in the title's history. Brian Logan's second and final reign was the shortest in the history of the title lasting only 1 day. Overall, there have been 11 reigns shared between 9 wrestlers, with four vacancies.

Title history
Key

Names

Reigns

List of combined reigns

Footnotes

References
General

Specific

External links

MDW Heavyweight Title at Cagematch.de
MDW Heavyweight Championship at USA Indy Wrestling

Mason-Dixon Wrestling championships
Heavyweight wrestling championships